The 2014 Tashkent Challenger was a professional tennis tournament played on hard courts. It was the seventh edition of the tournament which was part of the 2014 ATP Challenger Tour. It took place in Tashkent, Uzbekistan between 6 and 12 October 2014.

Singles main-draw entrants

Seeds

 1 Rankings are as of September 29, 2014.

Other entrants
The following players received wildcards into the singles main draw:
  Sanjar Fayziev
  Temur Ismailov
  Djurabeck Karimov
  Shonigmatjon Shofayziyev

The following players received entry from the qualifying draw:
  Sergey Betov
  Marat Deviatiarov
  Riccardo Ghedin
  Daniiar Duldaev

Champions

Singles

  Lukáš Lacko def.  Sergiy Stakhovsky, 6–2, 6–3

Doubles

  Lukáš Lacko /  Ante Pavić def.  Frank Moser /  Alexander Satschko, 6–3, 3–6, [13–11]

External links
Official Website

Tashkent Challenger
Tashkent Challenger
Tashkent Challenger